Jerónimo de Arbolanche (1546–72) was a Spanish writer.

16th-century Spanish writers
16th-century male writers
1546 births
1572 deaths